Soho House is a global private members social club. The original location is at 40 Greek Street, Soho, London. The company now operates clubs, hotels and venues around the world, and in 2015 changed from SOHO House Group to Soho House & Co.  Membership is selective and members are drawn mainly from the media, arts and fashion industries.

As of January 2023, Soho House operates 39 club locations worldwide, with plans to open 3 more within the year.

History and ownership
Nick Jones (Soho House founder and previous managing director) sold 80% of the club to British high-street tycoon Richard Caring in 2008. On 13 January 2012, the Financial Times announced that 60% of Soho House Group had been acquired by the US billionaire Ron Burkle, through his investment fund Yucaipa for approx. £250m, with founder Nick Jones retaining 10% and Richard Caring (Caprice Holdings) 30%. In September 2015, the company’s high leverage and limited free cash flow was under scrutiny by fixed income investors. However, company profit potential has been affected by growth in new clubs.

The company filed for an initial public offering in 2021, and went public in July 2021, trading under the name Membership Collective Group. The organisation will use the money raised to pay down debt and finance further expansion.

In November 2022, Nick Jones stepped down from day-to-day running of the business, citing a recent cancer diagnosis and recovery, and appointed Andrew Carnie as CEO.

Locations

Europe/Middle East
United Kingdom
London
180 House
White City House
40 Greek Street
Shoreditch House
76 Dean Street
High Road House
Electric House
Little House Mayfair
Little House Balham
East Sussex
Brighton Beach House
Somerset
Babington House
Oxfordshire
Soho Farmhouse
Windsor
River House
Manchester
Soho House Manchester (opening in 2023)

Netherlands
Amsterdam
Soho House Amsterdam
Greece
Mykonos
Soho Roc House
Spain
Barcelona
Soho House Barcelona
Little Beach House Barcelona
Turkey
Istanbul
Soho House Istanbul
Italy
Rome
Soho House Rome
Sweden
Stockholm
Soho House Stockholm
Israel
Tel Aviv
Soho House Tel Aviv Jaffa
France
Paris
Soho House Paris
Denmark
Copenhagen
Soho House Copenhagen
Germany
Berlin
Soho House Berlin

North America
Canada
Toronto
Soho House Toronto
United States
New York
Soho House New York
DUMBO House
Ludlow House
Los Angeles
Little Beach House Malibu
Soho Warehouse
Holloway House
Soho House West Hollywood
Chicago
Soho House Chicago
Miami
Soho Beach House
Miami Pool House (opening in 2023)
Nashville
Soho House Nashville
Austin
Soho House Austin

Caribbean
Saint Vincent and the Grenadines
Canouan
Soho Beach House Canouan

Latin America
Mexico
Mexico City
Soho House Mexico City (opening in 2023)

Asia
Hong Kong
Hong Kong
Soho House Hong Kong
India
Mumbai
Soho House Mumbai
Thailand
Bangkok
Soho House Bangkok

Membership
Soho House membership policies focus on creativity "above net worth and job titles" with "studied resistance to ostentation...[and] cultivated status signifiers," and favour moral values over financial success ("several execs were banned because they were thought to be abusive to their assistants"). In June 2015, Soho House had over 50,000 members and a global waiting list of over 30,000. In July 2021, Soho House had 119,000 members across 27 houses in 10 countries.

Activities
On 13 August 2017, the film Tulip Fever (starring Alicia Vikander) was first screened at London's Soho House.

Incidents and controversies
In 2002, the London branch of the club made headlines as Iris Law, the two-year-old toddler daughter of actor Jude Law and his then wife, actress and designer Sadie Frost, was briefly hospitalised after accidentally consuming a part of an ecstasy tablet she found on the floor of Soho House while attending a child's birthday party. The child was ultimately unharmed.

In 2009, more than 80 residents signed an appeal by a neighbourhood association against allowing Soho House to move into the top two floors of Luckman Plaza in West Hollywood, near Los Angeles. The opening of the West Hollywood location also drew opposition from Beverly Hills Mayor Nancy Krasne.

On 9 December 2010, American swimsuit designer Sylvie Cachay was found murdered in room 20 of the Manhattan's branch. Nicholas Brooks, her boyfriend of six months, was convicted of her second degree murder  and sentenced to 25 years to life.

In Amsterdam, the Netherlands, an attempt to open a new club also met protest. An Amsterdam House nonetheless opened in August 2018, as well as a second house in Barcelona.

In April 2021, a third wave of the COVID-19 pandemic in Berlin led to rising infection numbers, critically overburdened intensive care units in local hospitals, and closure of cultural venues for a citywide lockdown. Bottega Veneta received criticism for holding maskless indoor dance parties at Berlin's Soho House for artists and celebrities flown in from around the world. Though Soho House staff complained about the lack of safety measures and regulatory guidelines, management has remained silent and implied that staff was not telling the truth. Berlin's Soho House staff have stood up to the company's efforts to reframe what happened as "spontaneous", clarifying that the party spaces were booked in advance. Additionally, club members have made their dissatisfaction and disappointment known with some considering ending their membership;  police investigated the matter.

In popular culture
Soho House New York was featured in season 6 of the TV series Sex and the City in an episode titled "Boy Interrupted". In this episode, Samantha Jones (Kim Cattrall) pretends to be a member by using a stolen membership card.

In 2022, Soho House was mentioned in the Netflix drama Inventing Anna, where the main character, con artist Anna Delvey, when asked if she was rejected by Soho House in episode two, she replied: "I’d rather hang out at a McDonald's or start my own club and reject their members."

Soho Home
In 2016, the club launched a 'modern interiors brand designed for relaxed, sociable living', called Soho Home. The brand's flagship store located in Duke of York Square in Chelsea opened in 2021.

Further reading

References

External links

1995 establishments in England
Organizations established in 1995
Clubs and societies in London
Clubs and societies in Canada
Clubs and societies in Germany
Clubs and societies in the United States
Greek Street
2021 initial public offerings
Private members' clubs